The City of Chelmsford  is a local government district in Essex, England.  It is named after its main settlement, Chelmsford, which is also the county town of Essex. On 1 June 2012 Chelmsford was granted city status to mark the Diamond Jubilee of Elizabeth II.

History

The current district was formed on 1 April 1974 from the borough of Chelmsford, and most of the Chelmsford Rural District.

Chelmsford City Council 
Local elections are held every four years in the borough. The council has previously changed hands a few times between the Conservatives and the Liberal Democrats, with the Conservatives holding a majority on the council between 2003 and 2019. During the 2019 local elections, the Liberal Democrats took control of the council; the leader of the council is Stephen Robinson. The make up of the council by party is as follows:

Parish and town councils
The borough contains 26 parishes—one town council and 25 parish councils.  They are:

Town council
 South Woodham Ferrers

Parish councils
 Boreham
 Broomfield
 Chignall (Chignal St James and Chignall Smealy)
 Danbury
 East Hanningfield
 Galleywood
 Good Easter
 Great Baddow
 Great and Little Leighs
 Great Waltham
 Highwood
 Little Baddow
 Little Waltham
 Pleshey
 Rettendon
 Roxwell
 Runwell
 Sandon (includes Howe Green)
 South Hanningfield
 Springfield
 Stock
 West Hanningfield
 Woodham Ferrers and Bicknacre
 Writtle

Parish without a council
 Mashbury

Boundaries
To the north-west it borders the district of Uttlesford and to the northeast the boundary is with the district of Braintree.  It shares its eastern border with Maldon. To the southeast it borders the district of Rochford, to the south the district of Basildon, and to the southwest the borough of Brentwood. To the west the borough has a boundary with the district of Epping Forest.

Population
The total population of the area covered by the borough is 157,748 (ONS 2004 estimate). Approximately 60,000 live in the city, and over 42,400 live in the surrounding suburban and semi-rural parishes. Around 16,600 live in South Woodham Ferrers. The remainder of the population live in the surrounding rural areas, including the villages of Galleywood, Bicknacre, East, West and South Hanningfield, Boreham, Ford End, Pleshey, Highwood, Good Easter, High Easter, Chignal St James, Chignal Smealy, Howe Green, Roxwell, Great Leighs, Little Leighs, Broomfield, Great Waltham, Little Waltham, Great Baddow, Little Baddow, Danbury, Sandon, Rettendon, Runwell, Margaretting, Stock and Writtle. (Source: population derived from 2001 census). However, this number is expected to rise dramatically, with 40,000 homes to be built in the metropolitan area of the borough. This could bring the size of Chelmsford up to over 170,000 to be concentrated around Boreham Airfield, Broomfield, North Springfield and Beaulieu Park.

Geography
The borough has two major centres, the principal settlement Chelmsford in the centre and the town of South Woodham Ferrers to the south east.   The north west of the borough is predominantly rural.  Villages are found throughout the borough.

The River Chelmer flows into the borough near North End and flows to Chelmsford where the River Can converges with it at the city centre. The River Chelmer then flows out of the borough between Boreham and Little Baddow.  The River Can's source is in the north west of the borough. The River Wid flows from the South of the borough through Widford towards the centre past Writtle to join the River Can between Writtle and Chelmsford. The River Crouch flows along the part of the southeastern border below South Woodham Ferrers.  Hanningfield Reservoir, a Site of Special Scientific Interest, is located in the south of the borough.

Transport
The rail links, both national and international, which run through the borough, are all operated by Abellio Greater Anglia. Two national rail services operate. The Great Eastern Main Line runs through the centre, stopping at Chelmsford railway station. Services via Chelmsford operate between London Liverpool Street and Ipswich, Clacton, Harwich, Braintree or Norwich. The Crouch Valley Line also runs through the far south-east tip of the borough, stopping at South Woodham Ferrers running services between Wickford and Southminster.

The Amsterdam Express, a rail/sea/rail international service owned by also stops in the borough at Chelmsford, connecting the town to the Netherlands, via the North Sea.

There are several primary routes within the borough. One of these, the A12, is also a trunk road and runs from London and the M25, centrally in a north-easterly direction through the borough bypassing the city of Chelmsford onwards to Suffolk and Norfolk. Two other significant primary routes are the A130 which runs north-south across Essex and the A414, which begins as a primary route in Chelmsford but its terminus us Maldon in Essex. The A414 then runs west through Essex, meets the M11 and then its path continues into Hertfordshire via Harlow. Various other A- and B-Roads connect the borough, especially the city of Chelmsford to the rest of the county and beyond.

There is, additionally, a large integrated bus network provided primarily by First Essex which connects the city to towns and villages across the county. Other smaller operators also provide services, such as Stephensons of Essex and Arriva Essex.

Education
Educational establishments in the borough include:
Anglia Ruskin University
King Edward VI Grammar School, known locally as 'KEGS'
St John Payne Catholic School
Writtle College, an agricultural college
Great Baddow High School
Moulsham High School and humanities college
Hylands School Specialist Science and Sixth Form College
The Boswells School
Columbus School and College, a special needs school.
Thriftwood School, a special needs school.
Thriftwood College, a special needs 6th form
Chelmer Valley High School
New Hall School, opened 1799.
Chelmsford County High School for Girls
St Peter's College, the former Rainsford High School, which closed in August 2011.
The Sandon School
William de Ferrers School
Chelmsford College a college of further education
The Beaulieu Park School (Essex's First All Through School)

Tourism

Henry VIII's former Palace of Beaulieu is situated in Boreham, now occupied by the New Hall School. Also located in the borough include the RHS Garden, Hyde Hall at Rettendon, and numerous open spaces in Chelmsford, including Admirals and Central Parks. Writtle, where Robert the Bruce is said to have married his second wife Elizabeth de Burgh in 1302, has English Royal connections, with King John building a hunting lodge there in 1211. Much of the site now lies within the grounds of Writtle College, the internationally famous centre for horticulture and agriculture. A few miles away is the village of Pleshey, where stand the ruins of a once important castle mentioned in William Shakespeare's play Richard II. The entire circuit of the castle walls can still be traced in the village streets. American tourists often visit the village of Springfield, Essex, the origin of "Springfield" as a popular place name, first giving its name to the important City of Springfield, Massachusetts, and subsequently Springfield, Illinois, the state capital of Illinois, and Springfield, Missouri, among numerous others.

Freedom of the City
The following people and military units have received the Freedom of the City of Chelmsford.

Individuals
 Colonel Sir John Ruggles-Brise  : 1967.
 J Grange , Rapper and Mental Health Advocate
 Vicky Ford, MP

Arms

References

External links
Chelmsford City Council

 
Non-metropolitan districts of Essex
Cities in the East of England
Boroughs in England